First Nations in British Columbia constitute many First Nations governments and peoples in the province of British Columbia.  Many of these Indigenous Canadians are affiliated in tribal councils. Ethnic groups include the Haida, Coast Salish, Kwakwaka'wakw, Gitxsan, Tsimshian, Nisga'a and other examples of the Pacific Northwest Coast cultures, and also various Interior Salish and Athapaskan peoples, and also the Ktunaxa.

First Nations in British Columbia

Chilcotin Tribal Councils and First Nations

Carrier Tribal Councils and First Nations

First Nations of the Ktunaxa/Kinbasket Tribal Council

St'at'imc Tribal Councils and First Nations

Nlaka'pamux Tribal Councils and First Nations

First Nations of the Okanagan Nation Alliance

Secwepemc Tribal Councils and First Nations

First Nations of the Lower Mainland

Sts'Ailes (Chehalis)/ Chehalis Indian Band
Musqueam First Nation
Katzie/Katzie First Nation
Tsawwassen First Nation
SemiahmooSemiahmoo First Nation
Tsleil-Waututh First Nation (Burrard Band)
Kwikwetlem First Nation (Coquitlam Indian Band)

Tsimshian First Nations

First Nations on Vancouver Island

External links
 First Nations, Land Rights and Environmentalism in British Columbia German website that uses visual representations to support Aboriginal Title and Rights. 
 Government of British Columbia's First Nations A-Z Listing
 Aboriginal Tourism Association of BC: government-sponsored website that promotes aboriginal culture in the context of the Vancouver 2010 Winter Olympics.
 First Nations Health Authority: - partnership of BC First Nations - working with federal and provincial partners to improve First Nations health in BC.
British Columbia Assembly of First Nations (BCAFN) Community Profiles list

 
Lists of populated places in British Columbia